Nihal Singh CB (4 May 1863 – 20 July 1901) was the Jat ruler of Dholpur state (1873–1901) in Rajasthan, India.

References
Dr. Ajay Kumar Agnihotri (1985) : "Gohad ke jaton ka Itihas" (Hindi)
Dr. Natthan Singh (2004) : "Jat Itihas"
Dr. Natthan Singh (2005): Sujas Prabandh (Gohad ke Shasakon ki Veer gatha – by Poet Nathan), Jat Veer Prakashan Gwalior

1863 births
1901 deaths
Rulers of Dholpur state
Companions of the Order of the Bath
Recipients of the Kaisar-i-Hind Medal